= USCGS =

USCGS may refer to:

- An abbreviation for the United States Coast and Geodetic Survey, a former scientific agency of the United States Government
- US CGS, the United Nations Code for Trade and Transport Locations (UN/LOCODE) for College Park, Maryland, in the United States
